Edesamegina Endukalidina (Telugu: ఏ దేశమేగినా ఎందుకాలిడినా) is a Telugu Patriotic song written by Rayaprolu Subba Rao.

Modifications
 The song is incorporated in 1954 Telugu film Parivartana.
 The modified version of this song written by C. Narayana Reddy is incorporated in Telugu film entitled America Abbayi (1987) directed by Singeetam Srinivasa Rao. The music score is provided by S. Rajeswara Rao.

References

External links
 Watch the Video of Edesamegina song at Youtube.com

Telugu-language songs
Patriotic songs
Year of song missing